José Alarcón is the name of:

José Alarcón (athlete), Chilean athlete
José Alarcón (cyclist) (born 1988), Venezuelan cyclist
José Alarcón (footballer) (born 2005), Venezuelan footballer
José Alarcón (politician) (1878–1940), Spanish politician
José Alarcón Hernández (born 1945), Mexican politician